The Kenya national under-17 football team represents Kenya in football at age of U-17 level and is controlled by the Football Kenya Federation. The team competes in the African U-17 Championship, held every two years.

Team image

Nicknames
The Kenya national under-17 football team has been known or nicknamed as Harambee Stars.

Home stadium
The team play its home matches on the Nairobi City Stadium and others stadiums.

History

Fixtures and results
legend

2020

Competitive record

FIFA U-17 World Cup

Africa U-17 Cup of Nations

CECAFA U-17 Championship

References 

African national under-17 association football teams
Football in Kenya
under-17
Youth in Kenya